St. James's Hospital may refer to:
 St. James's Hospital, Dublin, Ireland
 St James's University Hospital, Leeds, England
 St James Capua Hospital, Malta
 St James' Hospital, Portsmouth, England